Hasnat Mehmood is a Pakistani visual artist who lives and works in Dubai, UAE. He was born on 3 March 1978 in Jhelum.

Art career 

Hasnat Mehmood was trained as a traditional miniature painter at the National College of Arts, but in his enthusiastic search for a new language in this medium he transformed the traditional practice into contemporary dialogue.  He is a highly progressive, radical artist. 
Hasnat Mehmood creates contemporary art employing a technique that is considered to be a traditional practice. The painting of miniature works of art is considered to be the cultural heritage of Pakistan; as such, it should remain recognizable as it was practiced in the past. For "purists", the experiments that Hasnat and others take in their approaches to painting minute works of art render the work to be anything but a miniature painting.

Earlier work 
I Love Miniature explores a number of these issues related to the miniature painting movement as it has evolved in Pakistan within the past two decades. In it, Hasnat copied the works of thirteen artists who work in this medium – Shahzia Sikander being perhaps the best-known practitioner of miniature painting in the global contemporary art world. By copying their imagery, Hasnat acknowledges and accepts the criticism about the copying involved in the arena of miniature paintings.

"Mona Lisa in Braille" expands this discussion to what is arguably the most famous work of art. Many of us may believe we know the details of this image, however, Hasnat explores how we do not look at things objectively despite having perfect vision. We come to a work of art with an entire network of ideas, opinions, and experiences. It is a system of understanding that frames our vision. In the work, the artist includes a description of Mona Lisa that appears on the Louvre Museum's website. It is the official interpretation, but it might not be what any of the painting's millions of viewers see when they look at it. Next to this text in Braille appears a print of the work, on top of which is the title, medium, and dimensions; the label for the artwork is integral to our experience of viewing art in an institution.

Recent work 
Quddus Mirza wrote of his work: "Mehmood has ventured into another realm and can be labelled as a conceptual miniaturist."

Of Holy land and I Love Miniature, Yeewan Koon said: "Hasnat Mehmood is perhaps the best known of the three artists and his works have been shown in galleries across the globe. The two main works in the show are formed by painstakingly painted circles that collectively read in Braille sequence, "Holy Land" and " I Love Miniature". We are reminded of the paradoxical concept that Orhan Pamuk introduced about reaching the height of aesthetic achievement through blindness. But it is the viewer who is rendered blind, at least metaphorically... "

On his recent work “The Inquiry of Art” the artist stated:   "The body of work produced for this show is an investigation of the very basics of Pakistani art in the present times... I think that art has never been an individual’s effort only; it has always been produced according to the times in which the artist lives." These portraits articulate this phenomenon because viewers will find a cross-listing of writers, etc. from one portrait to the next, indicating a specificity of time and place.

Hasnat has been exploring conceptual art within the aesthetics of miniature painting. The subtlety in constructing portraits of personalities close to him (starting with his wife and colleagues, as well as of his friends and other fellow artists) is a sign of his conceptual twist—rather than just a transformation from being a miniature artist—and a venture into something exciting and exquisite.

Solo exhibitions 
 2011: The Inquiry of Art.
 2008: Chawkandi Gallery, Karachi
 2009: Aicon Gallery, New York
 2010: Saloon, Lahore

Selected group exhibitions

2010 
The Havelian Express, group show at CAIS gallery, Hong Kong.

2007 
Aicon Gallery, London

2006 
 Between Two Worlds; Group show at Crow-eaters Gallery, Lahore
 Contemporary Art from Pakistan, Group show at Asia House and Manchester Art Gallery, UK
 Group show at HNTB Architecture, Washington D.C.
 Lila/Play: Contemporary Miniatures & New Art from South Asia, Australia
 Landscape: Places real and imagined, Group show at Alhamra Gallery, Lahore

2005 
 The Artist's Face, Self-Portraits of our Times, Gallery Rohtas 2, Lahore
 Contemporary Miniatures, Crow-eaters Gallery, Lahore
 Aldrich Museum of Contemporary Art, CT, USA (Exhibition would be travelling to Asian Art Museum)
 Voices, World Bank Office, Islamabad

2004 
 Contemporary Miniatures from Pakistan, Fukuoka Asian Art Museum, Japan
 Playing with a Loaded Gun, Kunsthalle Fridericianum, Kassel

2003 
 Karkhana, Touchstones Art Gallery, Rochdale, UK 
 Contemporary Miniatures from Pakistan, K3 – Project Space, Zurich
 Playing with a Loaded Gun, Apexart, New York (catalogue) 
 Miniatures Pakistanaises, Masion d'Art Contemporain Chaillioux, Fresnes, France (Catalogue)
 New Voices, Canvas Gallery, Karachi
 Around Miniature, Chawkandi Art, Karachi

2002 
 Paintings from Pakistan, Niavaran Gallery, Tehran

Collections 

 British Museum, London UK (Acquired for contemporary landscape section)
 Salima Hashmi, Dean of BNU, School of Visual Arts, Lahore

References

Artists from Lahore
Living people
National College of Arts alumni
21st-century Pakistani painters
Pakistani contemporary artists
Year of birth missing (living people)